The  was a commuter electric multiple unit (EMU) train type operated by the private railway operator Tokyu Corporation in Japan from 1969 until 2008. A number of 8000 series trains are still operated by Izukyū Corporation in Japan and on the KRL Commuterline network operated by KAI Commuter in Indonesia.

Technical specifications
The trains have typical -long stainless steel car-bodies. Tokyu operated the 8000 series as five- and eight-car sets, with three and six motored cars per trainset, respectively.

History
The 8000 series entered service in 1969. 187 cars have been built. Five-car sets operated on the Oimachi Line, and eight-car sets operated on the Toyoko Line. Tokyu withdraw the 8000 series from service in 2008.

Other operators
45 withdrawn 8000 series cars were transferred to Izukyū Corporation, and 3 sets 8 cars were shipped to Indonesia. The Izukyū fleet is formed as three-car sets.

See also
Tokyu 8500 series, EMU type based on the 8000 series

References

External links

 Izukyū rolling stock information 

Electric multiple units of Japan
Electric multiple units of Indonesia
8000 series
Train-related introductions in 1969

1500 V DC multiple units of Japan
Tokyu Car multiple units